The following lists events that happened during 1989 in Cape Verde.

Incumbents
President: Aristides Pereira
Prime Minister: Pedro Pires

Events

Arts and entertainment
Germano Almeida's novel The Last Will and Testament of Senhor da Silva Araújo published

Sports
Académica do Mindelo won the Cape Verdean Football Championship

Births
February 25: Anilton, futsal player
May 10: Ivan Almeida, basketball player
August 2:
Kuca, footballer
Josimar Lima, footballer
September 17: Steevan dos Santos, footballer
October 4: Rambé footballer

References

 
Years of the 20th century in Cape Verde
1980s in Cape Verde
Cape Verde
Cape Verde